Hurfeish (lit. "milk thistle" or possibly from "snake" ) is a  Druze town in the Northern District of Israel.

History
The town is situated on an ancient site, where mosaics and Greek inscriptions have been excavated.

In the Crusader era, Hurfeish was known as Horfeis, Hourfex, Orpheis, or Orfeis. In 1183 it was part of an estate sold from Geoffrey le Tor to Count  Jocelyn III. In 1220 Jocelyn III´s daughter Beatrix de Courtenay and her husband Otto von Botenlauben, Count of Henneberg,  sold  the estate to the Teutonic Knights. It was listed as still belonging to the Teutonic Knights in 1226.

Ottoman Empire
In 1596 the village appeared under the name of  Hurfays in the Ottoman tax registers as part of the nahiya (subdistrict) of Jira, part of  Safad Sanjak. It had an all  Muslim population, consisting of 41 households and 10  bachelors. They paid  taxes on goats and beehives, in addition to occasional revenues; but the largest amount was a fixed tax of 6,000 akçe; the taxes totalled 6,930 akçe. All of the revenue went to a Waqf.

In 1838, Harfish was noted as a Christian and Druze village in the El Jebel district, located west of  Safad.

In 1875 Victor Guérin  noted an ancient church, used by the 50 Greek Christians in the village. In addition, Hurfeish  had 300 Druze inhabitants.  In 1881, the PEF's Survey of Western Palestine (SWP)  described Hurfeish as "a village, built of stone, containing about 150 Christians, situated on a low ridge, with figs, olives, and arable land. There are few wells in the village, and four good springs on the south side."

A population list from about 1887 showed  Hurfeish to have  about 645 inhabitants; 115 Christians and 530 Muslims.

British Mandate
In the 1922 census of Palestine, conducted  by the British Mandate authorities, Hurfeish had a total population of 412; 386 Druze and 26 Christians. The latter were all Melkites (Greek Catholic). The population increased in the 1931 census to 527; 18 Muslims, 35 Christians and 474 Druze, living in a total of 110 houses.

In  the 1945 statistics, it had a population of 830; 20 Muslims, 30 Christians and 780 classified as "others", (i.e. Druze),  with a total of 16,904 dunums of land. Of this, 1,039 was plantations and irrigable land, 2,199 was allocated to cereals, while 91 dunams were classified as built-up (urban) land.

Israel

Hurfeish surrendered to the advancing Israeli army during Operation Hiram, October 1948. An IDF plan, December 1949, to expel the population was blocked by the Foreign Ministry.

Hurfeish was declared a local council in 1967. According to the Israel Central Bureau of Statistics (CBS) it had a total population of 5,200 in 2006, with a growth rate of 1.9%. As in 2014, the majority of residents was Druze (96%), with a small number of Christians (3.2%) and Muslims (0.3%). A large percentage of the population are police and army officers, serving with the Israel Police and the Israel Defense Forces.

Landmarks
According to the tradition, Sabalan, a Druze prophet, often identified with the Biblical Zebulon, escaped to cave after he failed to convert Hebron residents to the new religion, then he continued to teach the religion and also built by himself a room over the site of the cave. It is located in Hurfeish, on the top of Mount Zvul.

See also
Druze in Israel

References

Bibliography

 

  
 

  

   p. 72

External links
From Brazil to Hurfeish: Meet the First Ever Druze Lone Soldier
 Welcome To Hurfeich
Survey of Western Palestine, Map 4:   IAA, Wikimedia commons

Arab localities in Israel
Druze communities in Israel
Arab Christian communities in Israel
Local councils in Northern District (Israel)